Washington High School (officially George Washington High School) is a public high school in Cedar Rapids, in the U.S. state of Iowa. Built in 1956, it is named in honor of the oldest high school in Cedar Rapids.

Background
Built in 1855, the original Washington High School—not yet known by that name—opened in 1857. In 1869, it narrowed from a general school to a high school. Originally called "the schoolhouse," the "Cedar Rapids graded school," and the "second ward school", it received its current name in 1875 when all the Cedar Rapids schools were named for presidents. The oldest building was called Washington School. In 1887, Abbie S. Abbott began her 34-year tenure as Washington High School principal. The school was expanded in 1910 to help deal with overcrowding, but the expanded room from the addition did not suffice for long. The nearby vocational school Grant School was converted to a regular high school to reduce the burden. Deteriorating conditions at the original structure led to its abandonment in 1935. Four junior high schools in the area, which had been expanded in preparation, were converted to joint junior/senior high schools.

The present
September 3, 1957, was the first day of school at new Washington. Washington began with grades 10-12 and became a four-year high school in 1987.

During the 1956–57 school year, students voted on colors for the new school and selected red and blue with white trim. They also picked the “Warrior” as Washington's mascot.

In 1961,  of classroom space were added to the south end of the building—12 classrooms. In 1971, the area under the library was enclosed to provide new office space for the counselors. In 1990, a new gymnasium was built to accommodate the increasing number of recognition assemblies.

In 2003, a large wing of six classrooms and six science laboratories was added to the southwest corner of the building. At the same time, a new band room was completed and the entire original music area was remodeled to house the growing vocal and string orchestra programs.

The first principal, Fred J. Kluss, had been principal at Roosevelt before coming to Washington in 1957. Kluss was succeeded as principal by Don Birdsell, who served for three years. Robert O. Fitzsimmons became principal in 1962. Donald G. Nau took over as principal in the middle of the 1966–67 school year. Ralph Plagman was principal from 1981 to 2017. John Cline was hired as principal on April 19, 2017.

Art gallery 
In 2007 Washington High School opened an art gallery to feature the works of famous Washington alumni. The gallery includes works by Grant Wood and Marvin Cone, who both graduated in 1910 at the "old Washington" school. The gallery's centerpiece is Kanesville, a mural Wood painted in 1927.

Notable alumni

Adrian Arrington - NFL wide receiver
Alanna Arrington - Fashion model
Frank Baker - NFL wide receiver
Rob Bruggeman - NFL center
Ashton Kutcher - actor 
Arthur A. Collins - inventor
Marvin Cone - painter and art professor
Don DeFore - actor
Paul Engle - poet
Brenda Frese - women's basketball head coach, University of Maryland
Erik Koch MMA fighter
John Lipsky, economist
Bob Netolicky - professional basketball player. Member ABA All-Time Team.
George Nissen - developer of modern trampoline
Tyler Olson - Iowa State Representative from 65th District
AJ Puk - MLB pitcher
Beardsley Ruml - academic
William L. Shirer - author
Carl Van Vechten - writer
Dedric Ward - coach and wide receiver in NFL 
Grant Wood - painter

References

External links
 Official site

Public high schools in Iowa
Schools in Cedar Rapids, Iowa
Schools in Linn County, Iowa
Educational institutions established in 1956
1956 establishments in Iowa